Otter Rock is a high distinctive rock lying 3 nautical miles (6 km) north of Notter Point, Trinity Peninsula. Named by United Kingdom Antarctic Place-Names Committee (UK-APC) after the Otter aircraft used by British Antarctic Survey (BAS).

Rock formations of the Trinity Peninsula